Charles Wels (August 24, 1825 in Prague – May 12, 1906 in New York City) was an American pianist, organist, composer, and music teacher. He studied under Václav Tomášek before relocating to the US. In the US he produced piano compositions and a funeral march for Abraham Lincoln. (The Library of Congress has scanned in 60 compositions by Wels into its American Memory collection.)

He was briefly a Polish court-musician from 1847 to 1849.  In the 1860s he was organist at Christ Church of New York.

His pupils included Samuel Brenton Whitney.

References

External links

1825 births
1906 deaths
19th-century American composers
19th-century American male musicians
19th-century American pianists
19th-century classical composers
19th-century classical pianists
20th-century American male musicians
American Romantic composers
American classical organists
American classical pianists
American male classical composers
American male organists
American male pianists
American people of Czech descent
Male classical pianists
Pupils of Václav Tomášek
Male classical organists
19th-century organists